Donnie "D Major" Boynton, is an American songwriter, producer, multi-instrumentalist and music director, best known for his production contributions to Gerald Levert, Boyz II Men, Destiny's Child and Robyn albums, as well as assisting the musical direction of Tyler Perry's 2004 touring production Meet the Browns. Beginning his career as a keyboardist on UPN's 1997 late-night show Vibe, Boynton became a touring bandmember, accompanying gospel and hip-hop acts in concert such as Lil' Kim, Mase, Vanessa Bell Armstrong and Tye Tribbett, among others.  He is currently the keyboardist of touring R&B/jazz band Groove Centric.

Songwriting, instrumental, engineering and production credits
Credits are courtesy of Discogs, Tidal, Apple Music, and AllMusic.

Selected stage credits & appearances

References 

African-American songwriters
1976 births
Living people